John Sodaski (born January 14, 1948) is a former American football linebacker. He played for the Pittsburgh Steelers in 1971 and for the Philadelphia Eagles from 1972 to 1973.

References

1948 births
Living people
American football linebackers
Villanova Wildcats football players
Pittsburgh Steelers players
Philadelphia Eagles players
Philadelphia Bell players